The 2017 Match des Champions (English: 2017 Champions Game) was the 12th edition of the Match des Champions. The game was played between Élan Chalon, the winner of the 2016–17 Pro A season, and Nanterre 92, the winner of the 2016–17 French Cup.

Nanterre 92 won the game 95–69 over Élan Chalon and won its second title in club history.

Match details

References

2017
Match des Champions